Governor Gilmer may refer to:

George Rockingham Gilmer (1790–1859), 34th Governor of Georgia
Thomas Walker Gilmer (1802–1844), 28th Governor of Virginia
William Gilmer (1863–1955), 22nd and 24th Naval Governor of Guam

See also
Governor Gilmore (disambiguation)